Mongols are one or several ethnic groups largely located in Russia, Mongolia and China.

Mongol or Mongols may also refer to:

Arts and entertainment
 The Mongols (film), a 1961 film by André de Toth
 Mongol (film), a 2007 film by Sergei Bodrov

Other uses
 Mongols Motorcycle Club, a motorcycle club in the United States and other countries
 Mongol Rally, an international car rally
 Mongol language (Papua New Guinea)
 El Mongol, ring name of Mexican professional wrestler Raul Molina (1930–2016)
 Geeto Mongol, ring name of Canadian professional wrestler Newton Tattrie (1931–2013)
 Mongol 482, a popular pencil brand by Eberhard Faber

See also
 Middle Mongol, a language spoken in the Mongol Empire
 Mongolic (disambiguation)
 Mongul, a DC Comics villain